Club Deportivo Badajoz Femenino, formerly known as Sociedad Polideportiva Comarca Los Llanos de Olivenza and Club de Fútbol Femenino Badajoz Olivenza, is a Spanish women's football club from Olivenza in Badajoz, Extremadura founded in 2003.

History

2003–2013: SPC Los Llanos de Olivenza
After spending six years in the second tier SPC Llanos de Olivenza attained promotion to the country's top category in 2011 by topping its group and beating Abanto Club and Fundación Albacete in the play-offs.

2013–2017: CFF Badajoz Olivenza
Two years later it was relegated to Segunda División. Llanos de Olivenza then merged with CFF Badajoz, taking its current name and changing its uniform from red-and-white stripes and blue shorts to black-and-white stripes and black shorts and integrating its structure in men's club CD Badajoz.

In 2014 it lost the promotion playoffs spot to Santa Teresa CD.

2017–present: CD Badajoz
In 2017, after seven years of collaboration between, CFF Badajoz was integrated into CD Badajoz.

Former internationals
  Brazil: Vânia Martins
  Portugal: Raquel Infante, Carolina Mendes

Competition record

References
Notes

Citations

External links
CD Badajoz official website

Women's football clubs in Spain
Association football clubs established in 2003
Sport in Badajoz
2003 establishments in Spain
CD Badajoz
Football clubs in Extremadura